James Currie or Jim Currie may refer to:

 James Currie (birding expert) (born 1972), South African-born birding expert and television host
 James Currie (physician) (1756–1805), Scottish doctor and editor of the works of Robert Burns
 James Currie (politician) (1827–1901), Canadian politician
 James B. Currie (1925–2009), United States Air Force general
 Jim Currie, musician, of Goober & the Peas
 Jim Currie (basketball) (1916–1987), American professional basketball player
 Jim Currie (1841–1895), Old West outlaw who shot Maurice Barrymore and Ben Porter
 James Currie (shipowner) (1863–1930), Scottish scientist, President of the Royal Society of Edinburgh, owner of one of the world's biggest shipping companies

See also
 Jim Curry (1886–1938), Major League Baseball player
 James Curry (disambiguation)